Ameglio is a surname. Notable people with the surname include:

 Carlos Ameglio (born 1965), Uruguayan film director
 Giovanni Ameglio (1854–1921), Italian general
 Marco Ameglio (born 1961), Panamanian businessman
 Pietro Ameglio (born 1957), Uruguayan-born Mexican activist

See also
 Amelio